Bangiya Sahitya Parishat is a literary society in Maniktala of Kolkata, West Bengal, India. Established during the time of the British Raj, its goal is to promote Bengali literature, both by translating works in other languages to Bengali and promoting the production of original Bengali literature.

The organisation was founded by L. Leotard and Kshetrapal Chakraborty in 1893. Then it was known as The Bengal Academy of Literature. On 29 April 1894, the name of the society itself was changed to Bangiya Sahitya Parishat.
1894 saw the first officers, with Romesh Chunder Dutt as the first president and Rabindranath Tagore and Nabinchandra Sen as vice presidents.

See also 
 Manipuri Sahitya Parishad

References

Indic literature societies
Bengali literary institutions
 
Book publishing companies of India
Companies based in Kolkata
Organisations based in Kolkata
Indian companies established in 1893